A peshtemal (also spelled peshtamal, pestamal or pestemal; from Persian~ Fa puştmāl پشت مال back towel § Fa puşt پشت back + Fa māl مال cleaning) is a traditional towel used in baths. A staple of Persian and Ottoman hammam culture, dating back hundreds of years, the pestemal was originally designed to help individual bathers maintain their privacy. In addition to being highly absorbent, pestemals dry faster than thicker towels. 

It is also used to indicate which region people are from. There are many kinds of peshtemal, with different styles and colors in different areas of Turkey and Iran.

The peshtemal absorbs water as fast as a terrycloth towel, dries more quickly, takes up less space, is easy to carry and is therefore used as an alternative in bathrooms, pools, spas, beaches, sports facilities, and for baby care.

The peshtemal fabric is made of 100% cotton produced on manually operated looms in modern Turkey, historically in Antioch.

See also
 Fouta towel

References

 what is a peshtemal towel?
 How often should you wash your Turkish towels?
 10 ways to use Turkish Towels!
 natural turkish peshtemal!

Turkish culture
Persian words and phrases
Woven fabrics
Bathing
Personal hygiene products